Donna Scott is a Canadian business person best known as the founder of the fashion magazine Flare Magazine. 

Scott retired from Flare and went on to Chair the Canada Council for the Arts from 1994 to 1998. She also worked as the Executive Director of the Ontario Arts Council. She was named an Officer of the Order of Canada in 2000.

References 

Year of birth missing (living people)
Living people
Canadian women company founders
Canadian magazine publishers (people)
Officers of the Order of Canada